is a Japanese publishing company, founded in 1945 by Kiyoshi Hayakawa. It is the largest science fiction publisher in Japan; almost all winners of the Seiun Award for Best Foreign Novel are published by the company.

Notable books written by Japanese authors that are published by Hayakawa are Crest of the Stars and G.I. Samurai.

In 2022, Hiroshi Hayakawa, for 30 years the president of Hayakawa Publishing (having worked since 1965 at the independent family firm), was the recipient of the London Book Fair Lifetime Achievement Award "for his decades-long work in bringing international authors to the Japanese market, as well as his championing of science fiction, crime and non-fiction titles in Japan".

Magazines
S-F Magazine (first published February 1960)
Ellery Queen's Mystery Magazine (Japanese edition of the American magazine, first published in June 1956)
Higeki Kigeki (悲劇喜劇, a theatrical magazine first published in 1928 by Kunio Kishida)

Imprints
Hayakawa publishes books under a number of imprints.
 Hayakawa Mystery
 Hayakawa SF Series (December 1957–November 1974, 318 volumes)
 Hayakawa Library (1962–1969)
 Hayakawa Novels
 Hayakawa Nonfiction
 Kaigai SF Novels
 Mysterious Press Books (on hiatus since 1988)
 Shin Hayakawa SF Series (since December 2011)
 Hayakawa Bunko
 Hayakawa Bunko SF (for translated foreign science fiction works)
 Hayakawa Bunko JA
 Hayakawa Mystery Bunko
 Hayakawa Comic Bunko (under the Hayakawa Bunko JA imprint)
 Jisedaigata Sakka no Real Fiction (under the Hayakawa Bunko JA imprint)
 Hayakawa Engeki Bunko
 Hayakawa Mystery World
 Hayakawa SF Series J-Collection
 Sōzōryoku Bungaku 
 Hayakawa Shinsho Juice

References

Book publishing companies in Tokyo
Magazine publishing companies in Tokyo
Japanese companies established in 1945
Publishing companies established in 1945